Francisco Leonel Lima Silva Machado (born 19 July 1995), known as Chiquinho, is a Portuguese professional footballer who plays for S.L. Benfica as an attacking midfielder.

Club career
Born in Santo Tirso, Porto District, Chiquinho finished his youth career with Leixões SC. He made his senior debut on 30 July 2014, playing 62 minutes in a 3–0 home win against C.D. Santa Clara in the first round of the Taça da Liga. His Segunda Liga bow occurred on 27 August in a 1–1 home draw with C.D. Tondela, and his first league goal was only scored two years later in a 1–2 loss to FC Porto B also at the Estádio do Mar.

In February 2017, Leixões accepted NK Lokomotiva's offer of €200,000, and Chiquinho signed a three-and-a-half-year contract with the Croatian club. His first match took place on 25 February, as a second-half substitute in a 2–0 First Football League home victory over NK Osijek.

Chiquinho joined Académica de Coimbra in July 2017 on a one-year loan, with an option to make the move permanent, which eventually befell only for the player to move to S.L. Benfica on a five-year deal on 28 May 2018. He was subsequently sold to Moreirense FC, with Benfica retaining 50% of his economic rights.

On 12 August 2018, Chiquinho made his debut in the Primeira Liga, featuring the entire 1–3 home defeat against Sporting CP. He totalled ten goals in his only season in Moreira de Cónegos, the first being the only in the third round of the Taça de Portugal to oust Associação Recreativa de São Martinho.

Chiquinho returned to Benfica on 1 July 2019, signing a contract until 2024. In his first official appearance, against Sporting CP in the Supertaça Cândido de Oliveira on 4 August, he completed a 5–0 rout after having replaced Gabriel in the 82nd minute.

On 31 August 2021, Chiquinho was loaned to fellow top-tier side S.C. Braga without a buying option. The following February, also on loan, he joined Giresunspor of the Turkish Süper Lig.

Returned to the Estádio da Luz for the 2022–23 campaign, Chiquinho was initially deemed surplus to requirements. However, after Enzo Fernández's departure to Chelsea in the winter transfer window, he became an important member of the Roger Schmidt-led squad.

Honours
Benfica
Supertaça Cândido de Oliveira: 2019

References

External links

Benfica official profile

Portuguese League profile 

1995 births
Living people
People from Santo Tirso
Sportspeople from Porto District
Portuguese footballers
Association football midfielders
Primeira Liga players
Liga Portugal 2 players
Campeonato de Portugal (league) players
Boavista F.C. players
Leixões S.C. players
Gondomar S.C. players
Associação Académica de Coimbra – O.A.F. players
S.L. Benfica footballers
Moreirense F.C. players
S.C. Braga players
Croatian Football League players
NK Lokomotiva Zagreb players
Süper Lig players
Giresunspor footballers
Portuguese expatriate footballers
Expatriate footballers in Croatia
Expatriate footballers in Turkey
Portuguese expatriate sportspeople in Croatia
Portuguese expatriate sportspeople in Turkey